Ælfheah is a given name. Notable people with the name include:
Ælfheah of Canterbury (died 1012), martyred Saint and Archbishop of Canterbury
Ælfheah the Bald (died 951), Saint, and the first Bishop of Winchester
Alphege of Wells (died ), third Bishop of Wells
Elphege of Lichfield (died 1012–1014), Anglo-Saxon Bishop of Lichfield
Ælfheah, Ealdorman of Hampshire, brother of Ælfhere, Ealdorman of Mercia